The II SS Panzer Corps was a German Waffen-SS armoured corps which saw action on both the Eastern and Western Fronts during World War II. It was commanded by Paul Hausser during the Third Battle of Kharkov and the Battle of Kursk in 1943 and by Wilhelm Bittrich on the Western Front in 1944.

World War II

1942–1943
The II SS Panzer Corps was formed to take command of SS Division Leibstandarte, SS Division Das Reich, and SS Division Totenkopf  in July 1942 as the SS Panzer Corps. In August, it was sent to northern France before taking part in Case Anton, the occupation of Vichy France in November, during which it captured Toulon. In early February 1943, the corps, under the command of SS-Gruppenführer Paul Hausser, was attached to Army Group South in Ukraine and participated in the Third Battle of Kharkov.

The corps was renamed II SS Panzer Corps in June 1943, after the I SS Panzer Corps was created during that same month. In July 1943, the corps took part in the failed Operation Citadel, spearheading the 4th Panzer Army's attack in the southern sector. The corps' three SS divisions were involved in the Battle of Prokhorovka at the edge of the German penetration into the salient. After the operation was canceled in light of its failure, the corps was ordered to the Italian front in August. Only one division, the Leibstandarte ended up being transferred, along with the corps personnel. The remaining combat divisions remained on the Eastern Front to deal with the developing threats from the Soviet Belgorod-Kharkov Offensive Operation. Leibstandarte took part in operations to disarm Italian troops.

Between 20 September and 20 of November 1943 the corps conducted operations against Yugoslav Partisans in order to establish a connection with Army Group F in the Balkans and to secure  communications east and northwards from Trieste and Rijeka. In these operations, according to the Corps Headquarters' Medical Department, the corps suffered total losses of 936 men. According to Croat authors, in the first phase against partisans on Istrian peninsula (Unternehmen Istrien), some 2000 partisans and 2000 civilians were killed by German forces, and additional 1200 were arrested, with some 400 transported to concentration camps. In November, 1943, Leibstandarte returned to the Soviet Union, with the corps remaining in Slovenia, Istria, and Northern Italy.

1944–1945
In January 1944, the corps was ordered to the Alençon area of France to refit.

In March 1944, during the Soviet Dnieper-Carpathian Offensive in the Ukraine, the entire 1st Panzer Army, numbering over 200,000 personnel, was encircled by the Red Army in the Kamenets-Podolsky Pocket. This encirclement was the largest catastrophe facing the Wehrmacht since Stalingrad, which would precipitate the collapse of the entire southern sector of the German Eastern Front. Faced with a prospect of a new Stalingrad before the Allied invasion of France would even begin, Hitler was forced to yield to Erich von Manstein's demands for powerful reinforcements that would de-blockade the 1st Panzer Army. As reinforcements, he provided the entire II SS Panzer Corps (with the 9th and 10th SS Panzer Divisions) from France in April 1944, as well as divisions from the Balkan Theatre of Operations. Designated as the "Hauser Attack Group", they were commanded by Hauser. This was the first major transfer of forces from France to the East since the creation of the Führer Directive 51, which no longer allowed any transfers from the West to the East. It played the main role in de-blockading the encircled 1st Panzer Army in the Kamenets-Podolsky Pocket.

After rescuing the better part of the 1st Panzer Army, the corps then participated in the attempts to de-blockade the trapped German garrison of the 4th Panzer Army in the town of Tarnopol, which was declared to be fortress (Festung) by Hitler. However, the Red Army had prepared defenses there and the relief operation ultimately failed. After this, the corps was moved into the reserve of the newly created Army Group North Ukraine.

In mid-June 1944, the corps was ordered back west to take part in the Battle of Normandy, arriving to the invasion front in late June 1944.

The corps was involved in heavy fighting against the British 21st Army Group in the Battle of Caen. During this period, SS-Obergruppenführer Wilhelm Bittrich was placed in command of the corps. In August 1944, the corps participated in the battles in and around the Falaise Pocket. The corps then retreated across France. On 17 September 1944, the Allies launched Operation Market Garden, an airborne offensive aimed at capturing the Rhine bridge at Arnhem. The corps was involved in fighting against the British 1st Airborne Division in the Battle of Arnhem and also against the US 82nd Airborne Division and the British XXX Corps in Nijmegen. The Korps suffered heavy losses in the ensuing counter offensive in early October against the allied salient on the Island.

In preparation for the Ardennes Offensive, the corps was placed in reserve of the 6th Panzer Army and committed on 21 December 1944 near St. Vith. After the northern assault stalled, the corps was transferred south to take part in the attack on Bastogne. The corps' divisions suffered heavy losses in the battles against the 82nd and 101st Airborne Divisions. After the operation's failure, the corps returned to the defensive, seeing action against American forces in the Eifel region.

In February 1945, the corps was ordered to Hungary to take part in an offensive to recapture Budapest and the Hungarian oilfields. The corps took part in Operation Spring Awakening, launched near Lake Balaton on 6 March 1945. After the failure of the offensive, the corps retreated, alongside the I SS and IV SS Panzer Corps, towards Vienna. After the Soviet forces captured the city, individual units attempted to break out to the west. The elements of the corps surrendered to the U.S. Army on 8 May 1945.

Commanders
 SS-Obergruppenführer Paul Hausser (1 June 1942 – 28 June 1944)
 SS-Obergruppenführer Wilhelm Bittrich (10 July 1944 – 9 May 1945)

Order of battle
July 1943 – Operation Citadel
  SS Panzergrenadier Division Leibstandarte SS Adolf Hitler
  SS Panzergrenadier Division Das Reich
  SS Panzergrenadier Division Totenkopf
  167th Infantry Division (elements)

September 1943
  SS Panzergrenadier Division Leibstandarte SS Adolf Hitler
  24th Panzer Division
  44th Infantry Division
  71st Infantry Division
  162nd Turkestan Division

October 1943
  44th Infantry Division
  71st Infantry Division
  162nd Turkestan Division

September 1944 – Operation Market Garden
  9th SS Panzer Division Hohenstaufen
  10th SS Panzer Division Frundsberg

March 1945 – Operation Frühlingserwachen
 502nd Heavy SS Panzer Battalion
  2nd SS Panzer Division Das Reich
  9th SS Panzer Division Hohenstaufen
  44th Infantry Division
  23rd Panzer Division

References

Sources
 
 

German units in Normandy
Waffen-SS corps
Military units and formations established in 1942
Military units and formations disestablished in 1945